Major-General George Elphinstone Erskine (1841-1912) was a senior British Indian Army officer who served in India during the Indian Mutiny in 1857.

Biography

Born on 20 January 1841, George Elphinstone Erskine was educated at Bedford School. He entered the British Indian Army in 1857 and served in India during the Indian Mutiny, between 1857 and 1858. He served on the Oudh Commission between 1863 and 1889 and was appointed commissioner to investigate landlord-tenant relations in Oudh State in 1883. He was appointed to the commission for the amalgamation of the governments of the North-Western Provinces and Oudh State in 1889.

Erskine retired in 1895 and died in Brighton on 10 February 1905.

Family
Erskine married twice. His first wife was Blanche Cates, daughter of George Cates. His second wife was Eva Constance Sarah Edwards, daughter of Canon Ebenezer Wood Edwards. He had issue three sons who all joined the army. By his first wife:
Lieutenant-Colonel Keith Erskine (1863–1914), Indian Army
Captain Charles Ellis Hay Erskine (1866–1902), Indian Staff Corps, who died aged only 36.
By his second wife he was the father of
General Sir George Watkin Eben James Erskine (1899–1965)

References

1841 births
1912 deaths
People educated at Bedford School
British Indian Army generals
George Elphinstone